Viktoriya Polyayeva (born 5 August 1980) is a Kyrgyzstani freestyle swimmer. She competed in two events at the 1996 Summer Olympics.

References

External links
 

1980 births
Living people
Kyrgyzstani female freestyle swimmers
Olympic swimmers of Kyrgyzstan
Swimmers at the 1996 Summer Olympics
Place of birth missing (living people)